is a train station in Nichinan, Miyazaki Prefecture, Japan.

Lines

Layout 
The station consists of a side platform serving a single track at grade. There is no station building, only a simple weather shelter on the platform. The platform is located on the other side of the track from the access road. From the station entrance, a level crossing is used to cross the track to the platform. A bike shed has been set up at the station entrance.

Adjacent stations

History
Japanese National Railways (JNR) opened the station on 15 January 1949 as an additional station on the existing track of its then Shibushi Line. On 8 May 1963, the route was redesignated the Nichinan Line. With the privatization of JNR on 1 April 1987, the station came under the control of JR Kyushu.

Passenger statistics
In fiscal 2016, the station was used by an average of 4 passengers (boarding only) per day.

See also
List of railway stations in Japan

References

External links
Taninokuchi (JR Kyushu)

Railway stations in Miyazaki Prefecture
Railway stations in Japan opened in 1935